Matthew John Dowd (born May 29, 1961) is an American political pundit and consultant. He was the chief strategist for the Bush–Cheney 2004 presidential campaign and was an ABC News political analyst. On September 29, 2021, he announced a run for lieutenant governor of Texas as a Democrat against the incumbent, Dan Patrick. On December 7, 2021, Dowd announced the end of his campaign.

Early life
Dowd was born in Detroit, Michigan, to an Irish Catholic family. He grew up the third of 11 children; his father was an auto executive and his mother was an elementary school teacher before becoming a homemaker. His parents were Republicans. Dowd attended Cardinal Newman College in St. Louis, Missouri. Dowd attributes his early interest in politics to the Watergate Committee hearings during the summer of 1973 when he was 12 years old.

Career

Political strategist
Dowd volunteered for the campaign of Rep William Broomfield R-MI and, while attending college in St. Louis, Missouri, for the campaign of Governor Joseph P. Teasdale D-Mo. He also worked on the staff of Rep. Dick Gephardt, D-Mo. He began his political career as a Democrat, as a member of Senator Lloyd Bentsen's, D-Tex., Senate and campaign staffs. He also worked for, among others, Texas Lt. Governor Bob Bullock. In 1999, he switched parties to become a Republican.

During the 2002 midterm elections, Dowd was a senior adviser to the Republican National Committee.

During the 2004 presidential election, Dowd was chief strategist for George W. Bush's re-election campaign.

Dowd was the strategist for Arnold Schwarzenegger during his 2006 reelection campaign.

2007: Leaving politics, commentator
As reported in The New York Times on April 1, 2007, Dowd had come to feel a deep frustration with and great disappointment in George W. Bush, whom he criticized for failing to call the nation together in a time of war, for ignoring the will of the American public with regard to the Iraq War, for his re-nomination of former UN ambassador John Bolton after his rejected confirmation and for failing to hold Secretary of Defense Donald Rumsfeld accountable for the Abu Ghraib scandal. According to Democracy Now!, Dowd claims to have undergone a change of heart regarding the Iraq War, and adopted a position advocating a withdrawal from that country, after contemplating the likelihood of his own son's deployment to the country, as well as after seeing Bush refuse to meet with anti-war-mother Cindy Sheehan in summer 2005, while he was entertaining Lance Armstrong at his ranch in Crawford, Texas; President Bush had previously met with Sheehan in June 2004. Dowd cited these incidents, as well as Bush's handling of the Hurricane Katrina disaster, as reasons for this change. Upon leaving the Bush administration, Dowd has not been on speaking terms with former White House political adviser Karl Rove. Sidney Blumenthal, in an opinion piece in Salon, titled "Matthew Dowd's not-so-miraculous conversion", described Dowd as an "opportunist".

In December 2007, he was introduced on ABC's Good Morning America as its new political contributor. He also appears on the same network's This Week with George Stephanopoulos.

On December 2, 2010, Dowd penned an opinion piece in the National Journal defending WikiLeaks, writing that, "Republicans and Democrats seem to agree on a few things: That the government, in the name of fighting terrorism, has the right to listen in on all of our phone conversations and read our e-mails, even if it has no compelling reason for doing so."

Dowd is a founding partner of Vianovo, a strategy consultancy. He has taught at the University of Texas Lyndon B. Johnson School of Public Affairs. As of 2015, he is also a visiting Fellow at the University of Chicago Institute of Politics.

He is co-author of the New York Times bestseller Applebee's America: How Successful Political, Business and Religious Leaders Connect with the New American Community. His book A New  Way: Embracing the Paradox as We Lead and Serve was released in 2017.

Dowd has criticized former President Trump's Twitter use as being dangerous, impulsive and counterproductive. Dowd was especially upset with tweets aimed at the leader of North Korea.

Dowd came under widespread criticism when, during the first impeachment inquiry against Donald Trump, he tweeted about a congresswoman, "Elise Stefanik is a perfect example of why just electing someone because they are a woman or a millennial doesn’t necessarily get you the leaders we need." Congresswoman Stefanik called the tweet "disgusting, sexist and shameful". After significant pressure Dowd apologized and removed the tweet in question.

2021: Candidate for Lieutenant Governor of Texas
In September 2021, Dowd announced his campaign for Lieutenant Governor of Texas as a Democrat.

In October 2021, the Texas Politics Project at the University of Texas at Austin, Democrat Lieutenant Governor Primary vote choice poll had Matthew Dowd with 13% of the primary vote. In early December, however, Dowd announced he was ending his bid for the post, citing a desire for more diversity in the race.

Personal life
Dowd has married and divorced twice. He has three sons from his first marriage. His second marriage ended in divorce after one of his twin infant daughters died in the hospital. His eldest son, Daniel, is an Army veteran of Operation Iraqi Freedom and was deployed to Baghdad from 2007 to 2009 as a signals intelligence specialist.

Bibliography
Dowd, Matthew J., Ron Fournier, and Doug Sosnik.  "Applebee's America: How Successful Political, Business, and Religious Leaders Connect With the New American Community."  New York: Simon and Schuster, 2006. Includes interviews with people whom the authors met at Applebee's restaurants.

References

External links

 
 
 FRONTLINE (PBS) interview with Matthew Dowd
 
  (talk show; Dowd, 2004–2017)

1961 births
American broadcast news analysts
American columnists
American people of Irish descent
American political consultants
American Roman Catholics
Bloomberg L.P. people
Living people
Michigan Democrats
Michigan Republicans
Texas Democrats
Texas Republicans
University of Texas at Austin faculty
Writers from Detroit
Writers from Texas